Jönköping County is one of the 29 multi-member constituencies of the Riksdag, the national legislature of Sweden. The constituency was established in 1970 when the Riksdag changed from a bicameral legislature to a unicameral legislature. It is conterminous with the county of Jönköping. The constituency currently elects 11 of the 349 members of the Riksdag using the open party-list proportional representation electoral system. At the 2022 general election it had 271,666 registered electors.

Electoral system
Jönköping County currently elects 11 of the 349 members of the Riksdag using the open party-list proportional representation electoral system. Constituency seats are allocated using the modified Sainte-Laguë method. Only parties that that reach the 4% national threshold and parties that receive at least 12% of the vote in the constituency compete for constituency seats. Supplementary leveling seats may also be allocated at the constituency level to parties that reach the 4% national threshold.

Election results

Summary

(Excludes leveling seats)

Detailed

2020s

2022
Results of the 2022 general election held on 11 September 2022:

The following candidates were elected:
 Constituency seats - Jimmie Åkesson (SD), 17,856 votes; Acko Ankarberg Johansson  (KD), 792 votes; Helena Bouveng (M), 513 votes; Ilan de Basso (S), 2,158 votes; Staffan Eklöf (SD), 158 votes; Mats Green (M), 3,220 votes; Johanna Haraldsson (S), 1,406 votes; Annie Lööf (C), 3,845 votes; Carina Ödebrink (S), 2,051 votes; Niklas Sigvardsson (S), 762 votes; and Eric Westroth (SD), 265 votes.
 Leveling seats - Jakob Olofsgård (L), 493 votes; and Ciczie Weidby (V), 677 votes.

2010s

2018
Results of the 2018 general election held on 9 September 2018:

The following candidates were elected:
 Constituency seats - Jimmie Åkesson (SD), 15,535 votes; Acko Ankarberg Johansson  (KD), 259 votes; Helena Bouveng (M), 1,443 votes; Andreas Carlson (KD), 1,843 votes; Mats Green (M), 3,148 votes; Johanna Haraldsson (S), 1,725 votes; Annie Lööf (C), 7,132 votes; Angelica Lundberg (SD), 184 votes; Carina Ödebrink (S), 2,110 votes; Peter Persson (S), 2,385 votes; and Ciczie Weidby (V), 672 votes.
 Leveling seats - Emma Carlsson Löfdahl (L), 614 votes; and Emma Hult (MP), 504 votes.

2014
Results of the 2014 general election held on 14 September 2014:

The following candidates were elected:
 Constituency seats - Jimmie Åkesson (SD), 10,803 votes; Helena Bouveng (M), 2,285 votes; Andreas Carlson (KD), 2,445 votes; Sotiris Delis (M), 744 votes; Dennis Dioukarev (SD), 5 votes; Mats Green (M), 3,690 votes; Johanna Haraldsson (S), 1,680 votes; Annie Lööf (C), 4,670 votes; Peter Persson (S), 4,094 votes; Helene Petersson (S), 2,728 votes; and Thomas Strand (S), 1,320 votes.
 Leveling seats - Emma Carlsson Löfdahl (FP), 471 votes; and Emma Hult (MP), 869 votes.

2010
Results of the 2010 general election held on 19 September 2010:

The following candidates were elected:
 Constituency seats - Jimmie Åkesson (SD), 4,076 votes; Magdalena Andersson (M), 2,099 votes; Stefan Attefall (KD), 1,198 votes; Helena Bouveng (M), 4,533 votes; Carina Hägg (S), 3,501 votes; Annie Johansson (C), 4,919 votes; Bengt-Anders Johansson (M), 2,122 votes; Maria Larsson (KD), 4,962 votes; Peter Persson (S), 5,496 votes; Helene Petersson (S), 2,469 votes; and Thomas Strand (S), 1,079 votes.
 Leveling seats - Tobias Krantz (FP), 1,172 votes; and Kew Nordqvist (MP), 479 votes.

2000s

2006
Results of the 2006 general election held on 17 September 2006:

The following candidates were elected:
 Constituency seats - Magdalena Andersson (M), 1,578 votes; Stefan Attefall (KD), 636 votes; Helena Bouveng (M), 1,770 votes; Carina Hägg (S), 3,556 votes; Annie Johansson (C), 2,296 votes; Bengt-Anders Johansson (M), 2,797 votes; Maria Larsson (KD), 6,530 votes; Margareta Persson (S), 2,872 votes; Helene Petersson (S), 1,319 votes; Thomas Strand (S), 1,243 votes; and Göte Wahlström (S), 906 votes.
 Leveling seats - Alice Åström (V), 766 votes; and Tobias Krantz (FP), 995 votes.

2002
Results of the 2002 general election held on 15 September 2002:

The following candidates were elected:
 Constituency seats - Margareta Andersson (C), 1,696 votes; Anders Björck (M), 5,488 votes; Lars Engqvist (S), 5,198 votes; Carina Hägg (S), 3,785 votes; Bengt-Anders Johansson (M), 2,797 votes; 808 votes; Tobias Krantz (FP), 1,604 votes; Maria Larsson (KD), 1,517 votes; Martin Nilsson (S), 2,125 votes; Margareta Sandgren (S), 2,306 votes; Alf Svensson (KD), 14,165 votes; and Göte Wahlström (S), 834 votes.
 Leveling seats - Alice Åström (V), 962 votes; and Göran Hägglund (KD), 345 votes.

1990s

1998
Results of the 1998 general election held on 20 September 1998:

The following candidates were elected:
 Constituency seats - Alice Åström (V), 1,642 votes; Margareta Andersson (C), 2,001 votes; Anders Björck (M), 7,397 votes; Åke Gustavsson (S), 3,763 votes; Carina Hägg (S), 2,704 votes; Göran Hägglund (KD), 307 votes; Göte Jonsson (M), 1,751 votes; Maria Larsson (KD), 1,069 votes; Martin Nilsson (S), 1,835 votes; Margareta Sandgren (S), 2,702 votes; Alf Svensson (KD), 18,479 votes; and Göte Wahlström (S), 1,402 votes.
 Leveling seats - Marianne Samuelsson (MP), 707 votes.

1994
Results of the 1994 general election held on 18 September 1994:

1991
Results of the 1991 general election held on 15 September 1991:

1980s

1988
Results of the 1988 general election held on 18 September 1988:

1985
Results of the 1985 general election held on 15 September 1985:

1982
Results of the 1982 general election held on 19 September 1982:

1970s

1979
Results of the 1979 general election held on 16 September 1979:

1976
Results of the 1976 general election held on 19 September 1976:

1973
Results of the 1973 general election held on 16 September 1973:

1970
Results of the 1970 general election held on 20 September 1970:

References

Riksdag constituency
Riksdag constituencies
Riksdag constituencies established in 1970